Tout is a surname. Notable people with the surname include:

Ernie Tout (1874–1966), Australian rules footballer
Frederick Tout (1873–1950), Australian solicitor, pastoralist, businessman, and politician
Mark Tout (born 1961), English bobsledder
Thomas Frederick Tout (1855–1929), English historian